The second season of Kazakh reality singing competition The Voice of Kazakhstan Kids premiered on March 26, 2022. This is the revival of the series after the airing of first season on 2017 in Perviy Kanal Evraziya. After the Qazaqstan TV re-acquired the airing rights, a month after the airing of the regular version, it announced the second season of kid's version.

This season, coaching panel consist of four artist, named Jubanish Jeksen, Dastan Orazbekov, Zhanar Dugalova and the regular version's  fifth season coach Arapbayeva Marzhan. Hosted by Galym Kenshilik and Gulnur Orazymbetova.

Teams

Blind Auditions 
Blind Auditions started on March 26. Each coach has to complete its team with 15 young artist. At the end of the blind auditions, 60 young artist would go forward to the next round.

The Battle Rounds 
Battle rounds started on June 11. Coaches narrowing down its team into group of three artists to sing a song together. Out of three, only one would move forward to the Live rounds while the other two would be eliminated.

Live Shows

References 

Kazakhstani television seasons
Kazakhstani television series
Kazakhstan